In stability theory and nonlinear control, Massera's lemma, named after José Luis Massera, deals with the construction of the Lyapunov function to prove the stability of a dynamical system. In 2004, Massera's original lemma for single variable functions was extended to the multivariable case, and the resulting lemma was used to prove the stability of switched dynamical systems, where a common Lyapunov function describes the stability of multiple modes and switching signals.

Massera's original lemma
Massera’s lemma is used in the construction of a converse Lyapunov function of the following form (also known as the integral construction)

for an asymptotically stable dynamical system whose stable trajectory starting from 

The lemma states:

Let  be a positive, continuous, nondecreasing function. Then there exists a function  such that
  and its derivative  are class-K functions defined for all t ≥ 0
 There exist positive constants k1, k2, such that for any continuous function u satisfying 0 ≤ u(t) ≤ g(t) for all t ≥ 0,

Extension to multivariable functions
Massera's lemma for single variable functions was extended to the multivariable case by Vu and Liberzon.

Let  be a positive, continuous, nondecreasing function. Then there exists a differentiable function  such that
 For every positive integer , there exist positive constants k1, k2, such that for any continuous function   satisfying
 for all , 
we have

References

Footnotes

Stability theory